Nils Carlsson Åkerblom (17 September 1895 – 12 October 1974) was a Swedish equestrian. He competed in the 1920 Summer Olympics.

References

External links
 

1895 births
1974 deaths
Equestrians at the 1920 Summer Olympics
Swedish male equestrians
Olympic equestrians of Sweden
People from Sollefteå Municipality
Sportspeople from Västernorrland County
20th-century Swedish people